The 2022–23 MSV Duisburg season is the 123rd season in the club's football history. In 2022–23 the club plays in the 3. Liga, the third tier of German football alongside the Lower Rhine Cup.

Team

Transfers

In

Out

New contracts

Friendly matches

Competitions
Times from 1 July to 29 October 2022 and from 26 March to 30 June 2023 are UTC+2, from 30 October 2021 to 25 March 2022 UTC+1.

Overview

3. Liga

League table

Results summary

Results by round

Matches

Lower Rhine Cup

Statistics

Squad statistics

Goals

Clean sheets

Disciplinary record

References

External links

German football clubs 2022–23 season
MSV Duisburg seasons